Holmfirth railway station is a former railway station that served the town of Holmfirth in West Yorkshire, England.

History

The branch line to Holmfirth was built at the same time as the Huddersfield and Sheffield Junction Railway line from Huddersfield to Penistone, incorporated by act of Parliament in 1845. The engineering works were to the same double line standard as the main line, in anticipation of a widespread industrialisation that never materialised.

Route

The Holmfirth Branch Line ran for 1.75 miles, leaving the main line south of Brockholes. It curved south through Thongsbridge before ending in a single platform terminus (with a turntable) at Holmfirth.

References

Disused railway stations in Kirklees
Former Lancashire and Yorkshire Railway stations
Holmfirth
Railway stations in Great Britain opened in 1850
Railway stations in Great Britain closed in 1959